The 2014–15 Biathlon World Cup – Mass start Women started on Sunday December 21, 2014 in Pokljuka and finished on Sunday March 22, 2015 in Khanty-Mansiysk. Defending titlist Darya Domracheva of Belarus finished in 3rd place. Franziska Preuß of Germany won the title.

Competition format
World Cup Mass starts are held with only the 30 top ranking athletes on the start line. All biathletes start at the same time and the first across the finish line wins. As in sprint and pursuit, competitors must ski one 150 metres (490 ft) penalty loop for each miss.

2013-14 Top 3 Standings

Medal winners

Standings

References

Mass start Women